North East Lincolnshire Council is the local authority for the unitary authority of North East Lincolnshire in Lincolnshire, England. It was created on 1 April 1996 replacing Cleethorpes, Great Grimsby and Humberside County Council.

Political control
The first election to the council was held in 1995, initially operating as a shadow authority before coming into its powers on 1 April 1996. Political control of the council since 1995 has been held by the following parties:

Leadership
The leaders of the council since 2015 have been:

Council elections
1995 North East Lincolnshire Council election
1999 North East Lincolnshire Council election
2003 North East Lincolnshire Council election (New ward boundaries)
2004 North East Lincolnshire Council election
2006 North East Lincolnshire Council election
2007 North East Lincolnshire Council election
2008 North East Lincolnshire Council election
2010 North East Lincolnshire Council election
2011 North East Lincolnshire Council election
2012 North East Lincolnshire Council election
2014 North East Lincolnshire Council election
2015 North East Lincolnshire Council election
2016 North East Lincolnshire Council election
2018 North East Lincolnshire Council election
2019 North East Lincolnshire Council election
2021 North East Lincolnshire Council election

District result maps

By-election results

 

 

 

 Yarborough - 26 March 2009 - Lib Dem hold
 East Marsh - 26 August 2004 - Lib Dem hold
 Humberston - 11 April 2002 - Con hold
 Marsh - 7 June 2001 - Lab gain from Ind
 Yarborough - 21 October 1999 - Lib Dem hold

References

External links

 
Borough of North East Lincolnshire
Council elections in Lincolnshire
Unitary authority elections in England